Carie Brand Graves (June 17, 1953 – December 19, 2021) was an American rower and collegiate rowing coach. Competing in the women's eights, she won a gold medal at the 1984 Olympics and a bronze in 1976. She was also in the crew that in 1975 won the first national championship won by a University of Wisconsin varsity women’s team.

Early life
Carie Graves was born in Madison, Wisconsin to parents Robert and Dyrele (Derry) Graves. Carie grew up in Wyoming Township near Spring Green, Wisconsin, and she attended River Valley High School. Her paternal grandparents had moved to the Spring Green area in the 1930s from South Dakota so that Ben Graves, her grandfather, could take up a position as the land and farm manager at the renowned Taliesin. Her father, Robert Graves, had rowed for the University of Wisconsin–Madison.  Derry Graves, who came from a circus family in Baraboo, Wisconsin, was a trained registered nurse.  In the late 1960s, she worked as a nurse at the Badger Army Ammunition Plant, while Robert farmed.

College
Graves's first experience with rowing was as a walk-on when she was a sophomore at the University of Wisconsin–Madison in the fall of 1973.  In the spring of 1975 her team won the women's national championships in Princeton, New Jersey.  Her first international success came in 1975 when she won a silver medal in the eight-oared shell at the World Championships, as part of what came to be known as the "Red Rose Crew", coached by Harry Parker.

Nike World Games
In 1998, Graves and her three sisters competed in team rowing at the Nike World Games under the name Team Four Sisters. One of Graves' sisters is Leslie Graves, founder of the Lucy Burns Institute.

Olympics
Graves qualified for the 1976 Olympic team in the eight and won an Olympic bronze medal, the first time women's rowing was included in the Olympics. Graves continued to row and train during her tenure as head rowing coach for women at Harvard/Radcliffe, the first female Head Rowing Coach in the United States. She was a member of the 1980 Olympic team, rowing in the eight that won the Lucerne International Regatta over East Germany, but was unable to compete due to the boycott of the 1980 Summer Olympics in Moscow, Russia. She was one of 461 athletes to receive a Congressional Gold Medal. Her last Olympic competition was at the 1984 Summer Olympics in Los Angeles, California where she won a Gold Medal on the women's eight team.

Other competitions
In 1981 Graves was the six-oar for the women's eight that finished second at the World Championships in Munich. Also in 1981 she and her teammates raced in a four and won at the Henley Royal Regatta. This was the first time women were allowed to race at Henley.

Coaching
After earning a Master's from Harvard, Graves went  back to coaching in Boston at Northeastern University for 10 years. She then was recruited by the University of Texas, Austin to start their new rowing program in 1998. As coach of the Longhorns, Graves led the team to four consecutive Big 12 Conference championships between 2009 and 2012. She retired from coaching in 2014.

Personal life and death
Graves died on December 19, 2021, at the age of 68.

References

1953 births
2021 deaths
Harvard Crimson coaches
Rowers at the 1976 Summer Olympics
Rowers at the 1984 Summer Olympics
Olympic gold medalists for the United States in rowing
Olympic bronze medalists for the United States in rowing
Sportspeople from Madison, Wisconsin
American female rowers
Medalists at the 1984 Summer Olympics
Medalists at the 1976 Summer Olympics
World Rowing Championships medalists for the United States
Congressional Gold Medal recipients
People from Wyoming, Iowa County, Wisconsin
Harvard University alumni
21st-century American women